The Special Service Squadron was a component of the United States Navy during the earlier part of the 20th century. The squadron patrolled the Caribbean Sea as an instrument of gunboat diplomacy. It was headquartered in Balboa, Panama Canal Zone.

Records of the U.S. Atlantic Fleet have correspondence from the Special Service Squadron in 1907. The Special Service Squadron was stood up as a separate command from the fleet in 1920.  Its purpose was to protect the Canal and American interests both in the Caribbean and on the Pacific coast of Central America (and it remained a separate command when the Atlantic and Pacific fleets were combined as the United States Fleet in 1922). The squadron consisted mostly of small, older ships and was abolished in 1940 as part of the consolidation of U.S. naval commands in the early 1940s.

Commanders

 C.H. Hockson 1907
 Henry F. Bryan 1920-1921
 C. B. Morgan 1921
 William C. Cole (29 April 1922 – 1923)
 J. H. Dayton 1923
 ??
 Julian Lane Latimer (May 7, 1926 – July 8, 1927)
 David F. Sellers (July 8, 1927 – May 12, 1929)
 Edward H. Campbell (May 12, 1929 – 1930)
 Arthur St. Clair Smith (1930 – 1933)
 Rear Admiral Yancey S. Williams (1938)
 John W. Wilcox, Jr. 1939-1940

Also see
Service Squadron

References

Ship squadrons of the United States Navy